Khadija Zahra Ahmadi is an Afghanistani politician who served as a mayor of the city of Nili, in Daykunidi province, in central Afghanistan. She served from 2018 to 2021, until the fall of Afghanistan to the hands of the Taliban. She grew up in Iran in a refugee family who fled Afghanistan after the Soviet invasion. She is the second Afghan female mayor belonging to the Hazara ethnic group after Azra Jafari to achieve that rank. Zarifa Ghafari is a Pashtun native and the third women to serve as a mayor in post-Taliban era.  During the time Ahmadi served as a mayor, she received death threats from fundamentalist and Islamist groups like the Taliban. Like many other Afghans, she was forced to leave her country after the fall of Kabul and later resettled in Spain. On April 25, 2022, she was awarded with the prize "Reconocimiento Mare Terra" for her fight and advocacy for Afghan women's rights.

References 

Afghan politicians
Afghan exiles

Year of birth missing (living people)
Living people